Luís Filipe Silva (born 6 December 1969) is a Portuguese writer of science fiction. He has won the Editorial Caminho de Ficção Científica Prize in 1991 with the book O Futuro à Janela.

Bibliography

As an author

 O Futuro à Janela, short-story collection (1991)
 GalxMente I: Cidade da Carne, novel (1993)
 GalxMente II: Vinganças, novel (1993)
 Terrarium: Um romance em mosaicos (with João Barreiros, 1996)
 Aqueles Que Repousam na Eternidade, novella (2006)

As an editor

 Por Universos Nunca Dantes Navegados (2007), co-edited with Jorge Candeias
 Vaporpunk (2010), co-edited with Gerson Lodi-Ribeiro
 Os Anos de Ouro da Pulp Fiction Portuguesa (2011), co-edited with Luís Corte-Real
O Resto é Paisagem (2018), co-edited with Pedro Cipriano

As a translator

 Rainha dos Anjos (Queen of Angels), Greg Bear
 Crónicas da Espada 1 - O Encontro (Swords and Deviltry), Fritz Leiber
 O Verdadeiro Dr. Fausto (Jack Faust), Michael Swanwick

References

External links
  http://tecnofantasia.com – personal website
  Side Effects, weblog
  Detailed bibliography
 Profile at Infinity Plus

Fiction

  "A Recordação Imóvel", at E-nigma
 "The Rodney King Global Mass Media Artwork", at Infinity Plus
 "Still Memories", at Fantastic Metropolis

1969 births
Living people
Portuguese science fiction writers